Homodotis falcata is a moth of the family Geometridae. It is endemic to New Zealand and is found in the southern part of the South Island. The larvae of this species feed on leaf litter and adults are on the wing for most months of the year. The forwings of this species can vary in depth of colour.

Taxonomy 
This species was first described in 1879 by Arthur Gardiner Butler and tentatively placed in the genus Larentia. Butler used a male specimen collected in Dunedin by F. W. Hutton. In 1883 Edward Meyrick, thinking he was describing a new species, named this species Eurydice cymosema. Meyrick synonymised that name in 1884. George Hudson discussed this species under the name Xanthorhoe falcata in his 1928 book The butterflies and moths of New Zealand. Hudson stated that Louis Beethoven Prout believed the holotype specimen to be a large dark form of the species Asaphodes rufescens. J. S. Dugdale agreed with Prout, pointing out in his 1988 publication, that the New Zealand Arthropod Collection holds specimens that have coloration ranging from dark, intermediate to light and as a result Dugdale synonymised Asaphodes rufescens with this species. The male holotype is held at the Natural History Museum, London.

Description 
Butler described the male holotype specimen as follows:
H. falcata is similar in appearance to its sister species H. megaspilata but is a slightly larger moth with its forewings having a less distinct hook shape. The depth of colour of the forewings of this moth can vary from specimen to specimen.

Distribution 
This species is endemic to New Zealand. It can be found in the southern parts of the South island and occurs with its similar in appearance sister species H. megaspilata from Dunedin southwards.

Behaviour 

The larvae of this species feed on leaf litter. Adults are on the wing most months of the year but more frequently from July to January.

References

Moths of New Zealand
Moths described in 1879
Endemic fauna of New Zealand
Cidariini
Taxa named by Arthur Gardiner Butler
Endemic moths of New Zealand